Ronald Patrick Ross McManus (20 October 1927 – 24 November 2011) was an English musician, singer and trumpet player of Irish descent. He performed with Joe Loss and his orchestra. He was the father of Elvis Costello (born Declan MacManus).

Life and career
McManus was born on Conway Street, Birkenhead, to Mabel and Pat McManus. He began singing at the age of nine as a chorister at St Thomas' Roman Catholic Church. He attended Saint Anselm's College. He later adapted his surname to MacManus.

Prior to joining the Joe Loss Band, he had his own band called Ross MacManus & The New Era Music from 1950 until 1955. That bebop band played at various Liverpool nightspots. He later joined Joe Loss in March 1955. He wrote and sang "Patsy Girl", a 1964 single credited to Ross McManus and the Joe Loss Blue Beats. The song was featured on the "Fathers" episode of Bob Dylan's radio series, Theme Time Radio Hour in 2006. In 1970, he recorded a version of The Beatles' song "The Long and Winding Road" under the pseudonym of Day Costello, which spent 17 weeks in the Australian chart, peaking at number 16.

MacManus was responsible for the music and vocals from the R. White's Lemonade television advertisement theme song "Secret Lemonade Drinker", on which Costello sang backing vocals.

He also wrote and sang a number of songs for British 1970's sex comedies including the Alan Street trilogy (1974), Secrets of a Superstud (1976) and Can I Come Too? (1979).

He played the trumpet on two of Elvis Costello's albums: Out Of Our Idiot (1987) on the song, "A Town Called Big Nothing", credited to the MacManus Gang and originally recorded for the film Straight To Hell, and Mighty Like A Rose (1991) on the song, "Invasion Hit Parade". His 1972 album of cover versions of Elvis Presley songs, Elvis Presley's Golden Hits Sung by Big Ross & The Memphis Sound, was reissued on CD in 2008 as Elvis' Dad Sings Elvis.

McManus died in November 2011, at the age of 84.

Family
MacManus married Lillian Alda Ablett in 1952; the couple later divorced. Their son Declan, better known as Elvis Costello, was born in 1954. With his second wife, Sara Thompson, a singer who died on 12 November 2011, he had four sons: Ronan MacManus, Ruairi, Liam and Kieran, who were formerly in the band Riverway. Ronan was lead singer in  The BibleCode Sundays and Ronan and Ruairi also perform together as The MacManus Brothers.

UK discography

Singles
 "Patsy Girl" / "I'm the Greatest" by Ross McManus and the Joe Loss Blue Beats (HMV, 1964)
 "Stop Your Playing Around" / "Girlie Girlie" by Ross McManus (HMV, 1966)
 "Can't Take My Eyes Off You" / "If I Were A Rich Man" by Ross McManus (Decca, 1967)
 "The Long And Winding Road" / "Free (Unlimited Horizons)" by Day Costello (Spark, 1970)

Albums
 Elvis Presley's Golden Hits Sung by Big Ross & The Memphis Sound (1972)
 Elvis' Dad Sings Elvis (reissued on CD in 2008)

References

External links

 Elvis-costello.net mini-biography

1927 births
2011 deaths
Elvis Costello
English jazz singers
English jazz trumpeters
Male trumpeters
English male singers
English people of Irish descent
English Roman Catholics
People educated at St. Anselm's College
People from Birkenhead
British male jazz musicians